Between the inner surface of the general layer of the fascia which lines the interior of the abdominal and pelvic cavities, and the peritoneum, there is a considerable amount of connective tissue, termed the extraperitoneal fat or subperitoneal connective tissue.

Parietal portion
The parietal portion lines the cavity in varying quantities in different situations.

It is especially abundant on the posterior wall of the abdomen, and particularly around the kidneys, where it contains much fat.

On the anterior wall of the abdomen, except in the pubic region, and on the lateral wall above the iliac crest, it is scanty, and here the transversalis fascia is more closely connected with the peritoneum.

There is a considerable amount of extraperitoneal connective tissue in the pelvis.

Visceral portion
The visceral portion follows the course of the branches of the abdominal aorta between the layers of the mesenterics and other folds of peritoneum which connect the various viscera to the abdominal wall.

The two portions are directly continuous with each other.

References

External links
 
 http://www.surgical-tutor.org.uk/default-home.htm?system/abdomen/incisions.htm~right

Abdomen